Kween District is a district in Eastern Uganda. The district headquarters are located at Binyiny, one of the two town councils in the district.

Location
Kween District is bordered by Nakapiripirit District to the north, Amudat District to the northeast, Bukwo District to the east, the Republic of Kenya to the south, Kapchorwa District to the west and Bulambuli District to the northwest. The coordinates of Kween District are:01 25N, 34 31E.

Overview
The district was created by act of parliament and started functioning on 1 July 2010. Prior to that, it was part of Kapchorwa District. Together with Kapchorwa District and Bukwo District, it forms the Sebei sub-region, formerly known as Sebei District. The district has three town councils; namely: Binyiny, where the district headquarters are located, Kaproron and Chepsukunya.

Population
In 1991, the national population census estimated the district population at about 37,300. The 2002 national census estimated the population of the district to be approximately 67,200. The district annual population growth rate was calculated to be 4.5%. In 2012, the population of Kween District was estimated at about 103,300.

Transport
The Mbale-Moroto Highway passes through the western environs of Kween District, in a general north to south direction.

See also

References

External links
 Electoral Constituencies of Kween District

 
Sebei sub-region
Districts of Uganda
Eastern Region, Uganda